Jonathan Filewich (born October 2, 1984) is a Canadian former professional ice hockey player of Croatian ancestry Filewich was born in Kelowna, British Columbia.

Playing career 
Filewich was drafted 70th overall in the 2003 NHL Entry Draft by the Pittsburgh Penguins. After playing six seasons in the Western Hockey League with the Prince George Cougars and the Lethbridge Hurricanes, he began his professional career with the Wilkes-Barre/Scranton Penguins, Pittsburgh's AHL affiliate, in the 2005–06 season. He participated in the 2007 AHL All-Star Game at Ricoh Coliseum in Toronto, Ontario and assisted on one of Team Canada's goals in a 7-6 defeat to the Planet USA All-Stars.

On January 20, 2008, Jonathan was recalled from the AHL to play with the big club, the Pittsburgh Penguins. Wearing the number 34 on his jersey, he amassed a total of five games, with his NHL debut being played against the Washington Capitals on January 21. One highlight of his stint in the NHL was his 10 minutes and 47 seconds of time on ice in a 4–2 win over the New Jersey Devils. Jonathan was sent back down to Wilkes-Barre/Scranton in early February, just after the all-star break.

On December 19, 2008, he was traded from the Penguins to the St. Louis Blues for a conditional sixth round draft pick in 2010. Filewich was assigned to AHL affiliate, the Peoria Rivermen, for the duration of the season and didn't debut with the Blues. On June 30, 2009, he was tendered a contract with St. Louis but failed to agree to terms. On October 2, 2009, he left North America and signed with EC Red Bull Salzburg of the Austrian Hockey League. In the 2009–10 season, he posted 32 points in 45 games, as Salzburg went on to win the Championship.

On June 7, 2010, he signed as a free agent to a one-year contract with fellow EBEL team KHL Medveščak Zagreb.

After two seasons in Europe, Filewich retired from professional hockey after the 2010-11 EBEL season. During his final years as a professional hockey player, Filewich often worked on correspondence courses while in the team hotel and while travelling on the bus. Filewich graduated from Brandon University in spring 2013 with a degree in physical education and has said he would like to become a teacher.

After retiring from professional hockey, Filewich played senior hockey for the Souris Elks of the Tiger Hills Hockey League. In 4 seasons, Filewich scored 71 goals, and recorded 80 assists over a 71 game career.

Career statistics

Regular season and playoffs

International

References

External links
 
 

1984 births
Living people
Athabasca University alumni
Brandon University alumni
Canadian ice hockey left wingers
Canadian people of Croatian descent
EC Red Bull Salzburg players
Ice hockey people from British Columbia
KHL Medveščak Zagreb players
Lethbridge Hurricanes players
Peoria Rivermen (AHL) players
Pittsburgh Penguins draft picks
Pittsburgh Penguins players
Prince George Cougars players
Sportspeople from Kelowna
Wilkes-Barre/Scranton Penguins players
Canadian expatriate ice hockey players in Austria
Canadian expatriate ice hockey players in Croatia